Rigoletto or Rigoletto and His Tragedy (Italian: Rigoletto e la sua tragedia)  is a 1956 Italian musical melodrama film written and directed by Flavio Calzavara and starring Luciano Tajoli and Jula De Palma. It is based on the 1851 Giuseppe Verdi opera Rigoletto and incorporated music from that work.

The film's sets were designed by the art director Franco Lolli.

Cast  
 Aldo Silvani as  Rigoletto
  Janet Vidor as  Gilda
 Gérard Landry as  Duke of Mantua
 Loris Gizzi as  Count of Ceprano
 Cesare Polacco as  Sparafucile
 Franca Tamantini as  Maddalena
 Gualtiero Tumiati as Count of  Monterone
 Nietta Zocchi as  Giovanna
 Vittorio Vaser as  Marullo
 Renato Chiantoni as  The Poet
  Mario Terribile as  Borsa

References

External links

1956 films
1950s Italian-language films
Italian musical drama films
1950s musical drama films
Films directed by Flavio Calzavara
Films based on operas
Films based on works by Victor Hugo
1956 drama films
1950s Italian films
Melodrama films